The Le Tour de Filipinas is an annual professional road bicycle racing stage race held in Luzon, Philippines since 1955 as part of the UCI Asia Tour. It is held in April every year. While the course changes every year, the tour traditionally ends at Rizal Park, Manila, although recently the tour has ended in Baguio after being licensed by the UCI. Its previous names included the Tour of Luzon, Marlboro Tour, Tour of Calabarzon, Tour Pilipinas and Padyak Pinoy, before carrying the current name.

History

1955 – 1976: Tour of Luzon
In 1955, the Tour was launched as a four-stage race from Manila to Vigan race won by Antonio Arzala. But, a year later, the race was renamed as the Tour of Luzon and carried the name until 1976 (there was no tour held in 1968, 1970–1972).

The prominent riders included two-time Tour champions  Cornelio Padilla, Jr. of Central Luzon and  Jose Sumalde of Bicol. However, in 1977, a rift within the PCAP (see below) led to a split of two tours during the said year. However, according to the Padyak Pinoy website, the event organized by Geruncio Lacuesta is recognized on their official list. The tour's name ended by 1978 as Marlboro entered the scene.

1979 – 1998: Marlboro Tour
By 1979, Marlboro became the official sponsor of the tour and the event was named as Marlboro Tour, a name that is commonly familiar to ardent racers and fans. During these times, the tour expanded its routes, by including cities from Visayas in the leg, with the final laps regularly held at the Quirino Grandstand in Manila.

From 1997-1998, the tour allowed riders from Asia to compete in the event and was sanctioned by the UCI. It also led to Wong Kam-po of Hong Kong to become the first non-Filipino to win the event in 1997, after overtaking 1996 winner Victor Espiritu for the lead in the latter stages.

The format used for the teams are based on provinces with the national team included in the race. It was also the same format when Asian riders participated in the event beginning in 1997.

1999 – 2001: End of Marlboro Tour
In 1999, Marlboro backed out as sponsor which proved to be a devastating blow to the organizers. The tour lost about a possible 60-million pesos to finance the tour. With this, there was no tour held from 1999-2001. To compensate the loss of the so-called "Summer Cycling Spectacle", other groups formed mini-races during the summer.

A law was passed banning cigarette brands advertisements on TV, radio or any form like sport events like The Marlboro Tour.

2002 – Recent years
In 2002, the tour was revived after Airfreight 2100 of Bert Lina and Lito Alvarez financed the tour. A four-leg race was held in late-May known as Tour of CALABARZON won by Santy Barnachea. A year later, the tour was renamed as Tour Pilipinas, and held a 17-leg race, the longest since 1998. The tour was won by Arnel Quirimit of Pangasinan.

Ryan Tanguilig won in 2004 in a 10-stage tour. In 2005, the tour was renamed as the Golden Tour 50 @ 05, honoring the 50th anniversary of the Tour. 1998 champion Warren Davadilla, who won the last edition of the Marlboro, was the champion. In 2006, several disputes within the Integrated Cycling Federation of the Philippines led to a short eight stage event dubbed with the current Padyak Pinoy name, won by Barnachea.

Its current corporate sponsor is Airfreight 2100, the official brand-carrier of FedEx and Air21, thru the UBE Media, Inc. (producers of the TV program Panahon.TV), who has founded the tour since 2002. From 1979-1998, Marlboro was the carrying sponsor of the tour before backing out of the tour, resulting in the tour's stoppage for the next three years.

Stages

Marlboro Tour days 
These were the stages in 1996:

 Davao City to Carmen, Davao del Norte
 Tagum, Davao del Norte to Butuan
 Butuan to Cagayan de Oro
 Cebu City to Cebu City (individual time trial)
 Cebu City to Cebu City via Santander
 Dumaguete to Bacolod
 Iloilo City to Iloilo City via Pototan, Iloilo (team time trial)
 Iloilo City to Iloilo City via San Jose de Buenavista, Antique
 Pasay to Lucena
 Lucena to Marikina
 Marikina to Olongapo
 Olongapo to Alaminos, Pangasinan
 Alaminos, Pangasinan to San Jose, Nueva Ecija
 San Jose, Nueva Ecija to Banaue, Ifugao
 Banaue, Ifugao to Tuguegarao, Cagayan
 Tuguegarao, Cagayan to Vigan, Ilocos Sur
 Vigan, Ilocos Sur to Baguio
 Rosario, La Union to Baguio (individual time trial)
 Baguio to Baguio

Le Tour de Filipinas days 
These were the stages in 2019:

 Tagaytay, Cavite to Tagaytay, Cavite via Lemery, Batangas
 Pagbilao, Quezon to Daet, Camarines Norte
 Daet, Camarines Norte to Legazpi, Albay
 Legazpi, Albay to Legazpi, Albay via Sorsogon City
 Legazpi, Albay to Legazpi, Albay via Donsol, Sorsogon

Past winners

Tour of Luzon

Tour of the Philippines

Marlboro Tour

Le Tour de Pilipinas / Padyak Pinoy /  FedEx/Air21 Tour

In the 2016 edition, race organizers had to stop the stage 1 event due to unprecedented road repairs, followed by traffic jams in Tiaong, Quezon, the first in the history of Le Tour de Filipinas.

Jerseys 
Like other bicycle rices, the Tour also hands out specific jerseys:

 Yellow: General classification
 Purple: Best Filipino rider
 Green: Best sprinter
 Red polka dot: Best climber
 White: Young rider

Notes

External links
 
 
 Statistics at the-sports.org
 Le Tour de Filipinas at cqranking.com

Cycle races in the Philippines
T
Recurring sporting events established in 1955
1955 establishments in the Philippines